Drong Hill (‘Halm Drong’ \'h&lm 'drong\) is the double rocky hill rising to 179 m in the northwest extremity of Dospey Heights on Byers Peninsula, Livingston Island in the South Shetland Islands, Antarctica.  Situated 550 m east-southeast of Essex Point, 1.52 km west of Voyteh Point and 600 m northeast of Kardzhali Point.

The feature is part of the Antarctic Specially Protected Area ASPA 126 Byers Peninsula, situated in one of its restricted zones.

The hill is named after the Bulgar ruler Drong (6th Century AD).

Location
Spanish mapping in 1992 and Bulgarian in 2009.

Maps
 Península Byers, Isla Livingston. Mapa topográfico a escala 1:25000. Madrid: Servicio Geográfico del Ejército, 1992.
 L.L. Ivanov. Antarctica: Livingston Island and Greenwich, Robert, Snow and Smith Islands. Scale 1:120000 topographic map.  Troyan: Manfred Wörner Foundation, 2009.

Nots

References
 Drong Hill. SCAR Composite Gazetteer of Antarctica.
 Bulgarian Antarctic Gazetteer. Antarctic Place-names Commission. (details in Bulgarian, basic data in English)

External links
 Drong Hill. Copernix satellite image

Hills of Livingston Island
Bulgaria and the Antarctic